Christopher Robin Lowe OBE FREng is Emeritus Professor of Biotechnology and Director of the Institute of Biotechnology at the University of Cambridge and a Fellow at Trinity College. He has carried out research in the area of biosensors, biopharmaceuticals, and enzyme, protein and microbial technology. His   research has been recognized by over 20 major national and international awards.

Research 

His   primary research interest is in healthcare biotechnology, particularly work that  has significant commercial application.

Awards and memberships 

He is a Fellow of the Royal Academy of Engineering, of the Institute of Physics, and of the Russian Academy of Medical Sciences. 
He received the Pierce Award for Outstanding Contributions to the Field of Affinity Chromatography, 1989, the David Curnow Prize in Clinical Chemistry, 1991, the Schlumberger Stichting Prize, 1994 and the Queen's Award for Technological Achievement, 1996
He also receives the Silver Jubilee Medal of the Chromatographic Society, 2002, the Henry Dale Medal and Prize: The Royal Institution (London), 2003, the Royal Society of Chemistry Industrially-Sponsored Award in Sensors: Medal and Prize, 2005, and the Dade-Behring Award for Clinical Chemistry, 2006
He holds life membership in  The Royal Institution (London), 2003
He was named "Most Entrepreneurial Scientist of the UK", UKSEC, 2006 and received the Queen's Anniversary Prize for Higher and Further Education: The Royal Anniversary Trust, 2007

References

Sources & External Links 
University of Cambridge faculty profile

Living people
British bioengineers
Year of birth missing (living people)
Fellows of the Royal Academy of Engineering
Fellows of Trinity College, Cambridge
Officers of the Order of the British Empire